Peder Hansen (28 December 1859 – ??) was a Norwegian politician for the Moderate Liberal Party.

He was born at Hage in Fuse as a son of farmers Hans Johannesen Hage and Gurine Nilsdatter. He started his professional career as a smith at the shipyard Laksevaag maskin- og jernskibsbyggeri in 1877. In 1894 he advanced to foreman. From 1904 to 1911 he lived as a merchant in Kristiania, but in 1911 he settled as a farmer.

He was a member of Askøen municipal council, and also served as an elector while Norway had such a political system. He was elected to the Parliament of Norway in 1900. He served one term for the constituency of Søndre Bergenhus Amt before being a deputy representative during the term 1904–1906.

Together with Hedvig Johannesen he had a daughter, Ella Hage Hanssen (1900–1991), a painter who married zoologist and oceanographer Albert Eide Parr, a son of scholar Thomas Johannes Lauritz Parr.

References

1859 births
Year of death missing
People from Fusa
People from Askøy
Norwegian farmers
Hordaland politicians
Moderate Liberal Party politicians
Members of the Storting